Henley Beach is a coastal suburb of Adelaide, South Australia in the City of Charles Sturt.

History
Henley Beach was named for the English town of Henley-on-Thames, the home town of Sir Charles Cooper, South Australia's first judge. Cooper had a residence in the area adjacent Charles Sturt's property "The Grange", for which Grange Beach was named.
It has been asserted that Sturt's suggestion of "Cooper's Beach" was rejected by Cooper, who gave it the current name.

The Town of Henley Beach was promoted in the South Australian Register in 1860 as being "free from all the noxious smells which have been cause of complaint elsewhere". The Register again advertised the township in 1874:

Geography
Henley Beach lies between the suburbs of West Beach and Grange.

Demographics

The 2006 Census by the Australian Bureau of Statistics counted 5,405 persons in Henley Beach on census night. Of these, 49.9% were male and 50.1% were female.

The majority of residents (73.6%) are of Australian birth, with a further 6.8% identifying England as their country of origin.

Governance

Local government
Henley Beach is part of Henley Ward in the City of Charles Sturt local government area, being represented in that council by Kenzie Van den Nieuwelaar and Paul Sykes.  It was part of the Henley & Grange Council from 1915 until the merger with the City of Hindmarsh Woodville to create the City of Charles Sturt on  1 January 1997.

State and federal
Henley Beach lies in the state electoral district of Colton and the federal electoral division of Hindmarsh. The suburb is represented in the South Australian House of Assembly by Paul Caica and federally by Steve Georganas.

Schools
There are several schools in the suburb, including: Fulham Gardens Primary School,  Fulham North Primary School, Henley High School, St Michael's College, Henley Beach Primary school, and Star of the Sea School

Parks
Henley Square is located behind Henley Jetty on the Esplanade. Other greenspace in the suburb is the Henley Grange Memorial Oval and John Mitchell Oval. Henley Beach extends the length of the suburb.

Transport
Henley Beach is serviced by Grange Road and Henley Beach Road, both connecting the suburb to Adelaide City Centre. Seaview Road runs along the coast.

Henley Beach is serviced by public transport run by the Adelaide Metro which provides bus services to the Adelaide city centre and Glenelg. The Grange railway line was extended to Henley Beach as the Henley Beach railway line in 1894 and the extension closed in 1957. There was a tram line from the city centre to Henley Beach. This was initially a horse-drawn tram, converted to electricity in the 1920s and ceased operation in the 1950s along with almost every other tram line in Adelaide.

Gallery

See also

 List of Adelaide suburbs

References

External links

Suburbs of Adelaide
Beaches of South Australia